The Manchester and Lancashire Family History Society is an educational registered charity (No. 515599) for the encouragement of ‘the public study of family history, genealogy, heraldry and local history’ and promotion of ‘the preservation, security and accessibility of archival material'.  It was founded in 1964 in Manchester and became a registered charity in 1984.

The Society is one of the oldest and largest family history societies in the United Kingdom.  It is run by an Executive Committee elected by the Members. The Society, with several branches (Oldham and District, Irish Ancestry, Bolton and District and Anglo-Scottish Ancestry) offer a varied programme of more than 50 meetings every year. The Society is also active in various indexing projects. 

The Society’s journal The Manchester Genealogist (ISSN 0143-1331), published quarterly, includes articles on local history, genealogy, other topics of interest, reviews of books as well as up to date information about the latest family history developments.

See also
Federation of Family History Societies

References

External links 
 

1964 establishments in the United Kingdom
Organisations based in Manchester
Charities based in Manchester
Charities based in Greater Manchester
1964 establishments in England
Organizations established in 1964
Organisations based in Greater Manchester
Clubs and societies in Greater Manchester
Genealogical societies
Family history societies in the United Kingdom